Susie Ashcraft Gregg Parks Kendrick (October 22, 1895 – April 19, 1981) the telephone switchboard operator lauded for alerting the National Guard during the Battle of Columbus, March 9, 1916. She was recognized and celebrated for her heroism.

The Raid
March 9, 1916, Susie was 19 years old, five months pregnant and in her apartment at the back of the Columbus Courier newspaper office with her 15-month-old baby. Her husband, G.E. Parks, was the publisher/editor of the Columbus Courier and away for the night. Francisco "Pancho" Villa’s spies who, upon inspecting the town the week before, did not find the telephone switchboard which was housed in the Courier office due to a fire at telephone office two months prior. Before the attack, Villa’s soldiers cut the telephone line to El Paso, Texas but the line to Deming, New Mexico remained intact.
Parks was shot in the neck and she and the baby were covered in glass when, in the early morning hours, she placed the distress call to Deming and Captain A.W. Brock, Company 1 of the National Guard. She remained at the switchboard until Villa’s army was chased back over the border and she was relieved by a 13th infantry cavalry soldier.

Early life
Susie Gregg, (Susie Ashcraft Gregg was her given name at birth though she is often referred to as "Susan Parks" in news articles and other print media), began her early years in the wooded northwest area of Kirkland, Washington. She was the youngest of seven children born to David Duncan and Eliza Jane Gregg. They traveled by covered wagon from Nebraska to Washington, Washington to Montana, then back to Washington State. At 12, after her brother was killed from a log roll on Lake Washington, the family took the train to Columbus, New Mexico. She left school after the eighth grade. In Columbus she rode her horse, hunted in the Columbus desert, and worked on the family homestead.
At 17, she met Garnet E. Parks, 12th Infantry at the Post of Columbus, and they were married February 6, 1914. He bought the Columbus Courier and served as the Editor and Publisher. Together they produced the paper, ran the print shop and lived in an apartment in the back. January of 1916, a fire broke out at the Burton's telephone office which is why the switchboard was in the Courier newspaper office when Villa attacked.

Recognition
August 27, 1916, the wife of L. Bradford Prince, New Mexico’s territorial governor, and the Daughters of the American Revolution recognized her for her heroism at the Crystal Theater in Columbus. They presented her with a gold watch, and a 46 piece set of sterling silverware. The inscription read:

It was reported that, upon his arrival from Fort Bliss, General John J. Pershing visited Susie at the Courier office to praise her for her heroism in remaining at her post throughout the battle. 
 
An Official Scenic Historic Marker was placed at the intersection of New Mexico Highway 9 and Highway 11 in Columbus by the New Mexico Historic Preservation Division in October of 2016.

Later years
Susie and her husband Garnet stayed in Columbus for several years after the attack on Columbus in 1916 and through the Punitive Expedition. In 1919, they traveled with their three children to Washington State where they established the Tenino Independent newspaper in June of 1922. Garnet became ill and nearly died after a gallbladder surgery left a puncture to his bowels. When the puncture was discovered, he began to recover but was left with a morphine dependency crippling him and the family that had grown to five children. They acquired the Clackamas News in Estacada, Oregon but the stress was too much. They separated in June, 1929 after the birth of their sixth child and before the birth of their seventh with the plan for him to get help for his drug dependency. Soon, her letters were returned and he was never heard from again. She filed for divorce in August of 1930.
Susie Parks raised their seven children in Kirkland, Washington. She worked as a ferry boat waitress  and an aircraft sheet metal mechanic during the war. In 1946 she married Delco Kendrick and the two spent their last years traveling the country, visiting children and grandchildren, playing music, and square dancing.

References 

1895 births
1981 deaths
Switchboard operators
People from Lewis County, Washington
Pancho Villa
20th-century American women
People from Luna County, New Mexico
American printers
American women civilians in World War II